Bidens cabopulmensis is a rare species of flowering plant in the family Asteraceae. It is known only from the region in and near Cabo Pulmo National Park called Punta Arena. This is in the State of Baja California Sur in western Mexico.

Bidens cabopulmensis is a perennial herb up to 40 cm (16 inches) tall, generally branching only near the base. It produces one yellow flower heads per branch, each head containing both disc florets and ray florets. The species grows on coastal sand dunes.

References

External links

cabopulmensis
Flora of Baja California Sur
Plants described in 2013
Dunes of Mexico